Ernst Kuntscher (7 January 1899 – 10 October 1971) was a German politician of the Christian Democratic Union (CDU) and former member of the German Bundestag.

Life
In 1945 he participated in the foundation of the CDU. He was a member of the state parliament in Lower Saxony and also belonged to the district council in the district of Stade.

Kuntscher was a member of the German Bundestag since its first election in 1949 until 1969. He always entered parliament via the Lower Saxony state list of his party. From 9 July 1954 to 1961, he was chairman of the Bundestag Committee for Expellees, and from 1961 to 1965 of the Bundestag Committee for Equalization of Burdens.

Literature

References

1899 births
1971 deaths
Members of the Bundestag for Lower Saxony
Members of the Bundestag 1965–1969
Members of the Bundestag 1961–1965
Members of the Bundestag 1957–1961
Members of the Bundestag 1953–1957
Members of the Bundestag 1949–1953
Members of the Bundestag for the Christian Democratic Union of Germany
Members of the Landtag of Lower Saxony
People from Budišov nad Budišovkou
German Christian Social People's Party politicians
Sudeten German people
Nazi Party members